Margaret "Marges" Knighton or Carline (born 14 February 1955 in Sheffield) is a New Zealand horsewoman who won a bronze medal at the 1988 Summer Olympics in Seoul. Knighton, riding Enterprise was in the New Zealand Three Day Event Team which finished third, along with Andrew Bennie, Tinks Pottinger and Mark Todd.

Knighton has since reverted to her maiden name of Carline and after retiring for a while has now returned to competition, specialising in dressage. She is also  involved in coaching and judging.

External links
 Biography at New Zealand Olympic Committee website
 
 
 

New Zealand event riders
1955 births
Living people
Olympic bronze medalists for New Zealand
Olympic equestrians of New Zealand
New Zealand female equestrians
Equestrians at the 1988 Summer Olympics
Olympic medalists in equestrian
Medalists at the 1988 Summer Olympics